?? two question marks, also written as Unicode character  may refer to:

??, the chess annotation symbol for a bad move (a blunder)
??, an emphasis upon a question
Null coalescing operator, in computer programming
In Windows, the Unicode character ⁇ is valid in a file or directory name, though the normal question mark is a reserved character which cannot be so used.

See also 
 Question mark (disambiguation)